Esfeden (also Romanized as Esfedān) is a city in the Central District of Qaen County, South Khorasan Province, Iran. At the 2006 census, its population was 3,145, in 759 families.

References 

Populated places in Qaen County

Cities in South Khorasan Province